Britton is a surname. Notable people with the surname include:

 Andrew Britton (1981–2008), British-born American author
 Barbara Britton (1919–1980), American film and television actress
 Ben Britton (born 1985), British scientist
 Cameron Britton (born 1986), American actor
 Celia Britton (born 1946), British scholar of French Caribbean literature and thought
 Chris Britton (baseball) (born 1982), American baseball player
 Christopher Britton (actor) (born 1961), Canadian-born actor
 Cliff Britton (1909–1975), British football player and manager
 Connie Britton (born 1968), American actress
 David Britton (1945–2020), British publisher, writer and artist
 David Britton (basketball) (born 1958), American basketball player
 Elizabeth Gertrude Britton (1858–1934), American botanist
 Fern Britton (born 1957), British television presenter
 Fionnuala Britton (born 1984), European champion in cross country
 Fred C. Britton (1889–1931) artist and educator in South Australia
 George Bryant Britton (1863–1929), English boot and shoe manufacturer and Liberal Party Member of Parliament
 Gerry Britton (born 1970), Scottish footballer and manager
 Halland Britton (1890–1975), English runner
 Helene Hathaway Robison Britton (1879–1950), American owner of St. Louis Cardinals
 Ian Britton (English footballer) (born 1956), English footballer
 Ian Britton (Scottish footballer) (1954–2016), Scottish footballer
 Jack Britton (1885–1962), three-time world welterweight boxing champion
 James Britton (disambiguation), several individuals
 Jill Britton (1944–2016), Canadian mathematics educator
 John Britton (antiquary) (1771–1857), English antiquarian
 John Britton (doctor) (1925–1994), assassinated abortion provider
 John Britton (martyr) (15??–1598), English Catholic martyr, executed during the reign of Elizabeth I
 John Britton (mathematician) (1927–1994), British mathematician
 Leon Britton (born 1982), English footballer
 Nan Britton (1896–1991), mistress of U.S. President Warren G. Harding
 Nathaniel Lord Britton (1859–1934), American botanist
 Pamela Britton (1923–1974), American actress
 Pamela Britton (author), American author 
 Samantha Britton (born 1973), English retired footballer
 Sherry Britton (1918–2008), American burlesque performer
 Tony Britton (1924–2019), English actor
 W. H. Britton (1892–1982), American college basketball and football coach
 Zack Britton (born 1987), American baseball player

See also 
 Britten (surname)

English-language surnames
Ethnonymic surnames